Events from the year 1130 in Ireland.

Incumbents
High King: Toirdelbach Ua Conchobair

Events

Births
Richard de Clare, 2nd Earl of Pembroke (a.k.a. Strongbow), who led the Norman invasion of Ireland (died 1176).

Deaths

Notes